The Dodge Challenger is the name of three different generations of automobiles (two of those being pony cars) produced by American automobile manufacturer Dodge. However, the first use of the Challenger name by Dodge was in 1959 for marketing a "value version" of the full-sized Coronet Silver Challenger.

From model years 1970 to 1974, the first generation Dodge Challenger pony car was built using the Chrysler E platform in hardtop and convertible body styles sharing major components with the Plymouth Barracuda.

The second generation, from model years 1978 to 1983, was a badge engineered Mitsubishi Galant Lambda, a coupe version of an economical compact car.

The third and current generation is a pony car that was introduced in early 2008 originally as a rival to the evolved fifth generation Ford Mustang and the fifth generation Chevrolet Camaro.

In November 2021, Stellantis announced that 2023 model year would be the final model year for both the LD Dodge Charger and LA Dodge Challenger, as the company will focus its future plans on electric vehicles rather than fossil fuel powered vehicles, especially with tougher automotive emissions standards of being rolled out and required by the Environmental Protection Agency for the 2023 model year.

First generation (1970–1974)

Introduced in fall 1969 for the 1970 model year, the Challenger was one of two Chrysler E-body cars, the other being the slightly smaller Plymouth Barracuda. Positioned to compete against the Mercury Cougar and Pontiac Firebird in the upper end of the pony car market segment, it was "a rather late response" to the Ford Mustang, which debuted in April 1964. Even so, Chrysler intended the new Challenger as the most potent pony car ever, and like the less expensive Barracuda, it was available in a staggering number of trim and option levels, and with virtually every engine in Chrysler's inventory.

The first usage of the "challenger" name was for a trim package in 1959 called the Dodge Silver Challenger which was a two-door coupe only.

The Challenger's longer wheelbase, larger dimensions, and more luxurious interior were prompted by the launch of the 1967 Mercury Cougar, likewise, a bigger, more luxurious, and more expensive pony car aimed at affluent young American buyers. The  wheelbase was  longer than the Barracuda's, and the Dodge differed substantially in its sheetmetal, much as the Cougar differed from the shorter-wheelbase Mustang. Air conditioning and a rear window defogger were optional. With 1971 being the sole exception, the front ends of both cars differed from each other in that the Challenger had four headlights and the Barracuda had only two; a trend replicated by offerings from Chrysler's rivals. 

The exterior design was penned by Carl Cameron, who was also responsible for the exterior designs of the 1966 Dodge Charger. Cameron based the 1970 Challenger grille on an older sketch of a stillborn 1966 Charger prototype that was to have a turbine engine. The pony car segment was already declining by the time the Challenger arrived. Sales fell dramatically after 1970, and though sales rose for the 1973 model year with over 27,800 cars being sold, Challenger production ceased midway through the 1974 model year. A total of 165,437 first-generation Challengers were sold.

Model years

1970
For its introductory model year the Challenger was available in two series, Challenger and Challenger R/T, and three models, two-door hardtop, Special Edition two-door hardtop, or convertible. The base model was the Challenger with either an inline-6 or V8 engine. The Special Edition hardtop, available on either the base Challenger or on the R/T, added a number of appearance, convenience, and comfort features. Produced for the 1970 model year only, this more luxurious SE specification included as standard a vinyl roof with a "SE" medallions on the pillars, a smaller "formal" rear window, leather and vinyl bucket seats, and an overhead interior console that contained three warning lights (door ajar, low fuel, and seatbelts). The standard engine on the base model was a  Straight-6. The standard engine on the higher trim models was a  V8 with a 2-barrel carburetor. A 4-speed manual was optional on all engines except the  Inline-6 and the 2-barrel  V8.

The standard transmission was a 3-speed manual. The R/T was available in either the hardtop or convertible. The Challenger R/T came with a Rallye instrument cluster that included a  speedometer, an 8,000 rpm tachometer and an oil pressure gauge. The shaker hood scoop was not available after 1971.

A mid-year introduction was the low-priced Challenger Deputy, a coupe with fixed rear quarter windows and stripped of some of the base car's trim, however, the fixed rear side glass is the most notable identifier.
The "Western Sport Special" was a version available only to west coast dealers. It came with a rear-exit exhaust system and Western Sport Special identification on the rear decklid. Some examples came with a vacuum-operated trunk release.

The 1970 Dodge Challenger T/A

A special model only available for the 1970 model year was the Challenger T/A (Trans Am) racing homologation car. In order to race in the Sports Car Club of America's Trans American Sedan Championship Trans Am, Dodge built a street version of its race car (just like Plymouth with its Plymouth 'Cuda AAR) which it called the Dodge Challenger T/A (Trans Am). Although the race cars ran a destroked version of the 340, street versions took the 340 and added a trio of two-barrel carburetors atop an aluminum intake manifold, creating the 340 Six Pack. Air came in through a suitcase-sized air scoop molded into the pinned-down, hinged matte-black fiberglass hood. A low-restriction dual-outlet exhaust ran to the stock muffler location, then reversed direction to exit in chrome-tipped "megaphone" outlets in front of the rear wheels. Options included a TorqueFlite automatic or pistol-grip Hurst-shifted four-speed transmission, 3.55:1 or 3.90:1 gear ratios, as well as manual or power steering. Front disc brakes were standard. The special Rallye suspension used heavy-duty parts and increased the rate of the rear springs. The T/A was one of the first U.S. muscle cars to fit different size tires at the front and rear: E60x15 Goodyear Polyglas in the front, and G60x15 on the rear axle. The modified chamber elevated the tail enough to clear the rear tires and its side exhaust outlets. Thick dual side stripes, bold ID graphics, a fiberglass ducktail rear spoiler, and a fiberglass front spoiler were also included. The interior was identical to other Challengers.

Dodge contracted Ray Caldwell's Autodynamics in Marblehead, Massachusetts to run the factory Trans-Am team. Sam Posey drove the No.77 "sub-lime" painted car that Caldwell's team built from a car taken off a local dealer's showroom floor. When the No.76 was completed mid-season from a chassis provided by Dan Gurney's All American Racers, Posey alternated between the two. Both cars ran the final two races, with Posey in the #77. Ronnie Bucknum drove the No.76 at Seattle Washington, and Tony Adamowicz drove it at Riverside, California.

The Challenger T/A's scored a few top-three finishes, but lack of a development budget and the short-lived Keith Black built  engines led to Dodge leaving the series at season's end. The street version suffered from severe understeer in fast corners, largely due to the smaller front tires. A total of 2,399 T/As were made. A 1971 model using the 340 engine with a 4-barrel carburetor was planned and appeared in advertising, but was not produced since Dodge had withdrawn from the race series.

1971
For the 1971 model year the Challenger Coupe became the entry-level model, with either a straight-six or V8 engine. Like the Challenger Deputy it replaced, it had fixed rear quarter windows and a basic black steering wheel with horn button.

1972
For the 1972 model year, the options lists (both for performance and appearance/convenience items) had been drastically cut back. The convertible version (though a sunroof was made available), most interior upgrade options (in particular leather seats), comfort/convenience items (in particular power windows and power seats), and all the big-block engine options were gone. The R/T series was replaced by the Challenger Rallye series. The Rallye model featured four simulated vents on the front fenders, from which exited matte black strobe tape stripes. Engine choices were down to three: the  slant-6,  V8, and a  V8 that was equipped with a 4-barrel carburetor, dual exhausts, as well as a performance-oriented camshaft and heads. All three engines were detuned to lower compression ratios in order to run on lead-free gasoline, and the horsepower ratings were lowered to reflect the more accurate Society of Automotive Engineers (SAE) net horsepower calculations. Each engine could be mated to a 3-speed manual or automatic transmission, while the 340 could also be equipped with a 4-speed manual if so ordered. The performance axle ratios were also gone except for a 3.55 sure grip which could only be had with the 340 and the heavy-duty suspension. The 1972 models also received a new grille that extended beneath the front bumper, as well as new rear tail-lights. Toward the end of the 1971 model year, a few convertibles were made with the 1972 front end (grille, lights, etc.) and rear end (tail lights and their panel). The only way to ascertain these 1972 Challenger convertibles is to look at its fender tag. On the code line which gives the dealer order number, that number will start with an "R", which designates "Special Meaning" (in this case, a TV 'special promotions' car).

1973–1974

The 1972 grille and tail-light arrangement were carried over for the 1973 (and 1974) model years, and the mandatory 5 mph bumpers were added. While the  six-cylinder engine was dropped, (leaving just the two V8s), all option lists otherwise were carry-overs from 1972.

For 1974, the  engine was replaced by a  version offering , but the pony car market had fallen off and production of Challengers ceased in late April 1974.

Cosmetic variations

Although the body style remained the same throughout the Challenger's five-year run, there were two notable changes to the front grille. The 1971 models had a "split" grille, while 1972 introduced a design that extended the grille (nicknamed the "sad-mouth") beneath the front bumper. With this change to the front end, 1972 through 1974 models had little to no variation. The only way to properly distinguish them is that the 1972s had flush-mounted bumpers with no bumper guards, (small bumper guards were optional), while both the 1973 and 1974 models had the protruding "" bumpers (with a rubber-type filler behind them) in conjunction with large bumper guards. The 1974 cars had larger rear bumper guards to meet the (new for 1974 and on) rear  rear impact law. These changes were made to meet U.S. regulations regarding crash test safety.

The 1970 taillights went all the way across the back of the car, with the backup light in the middle. In 1971, the backup lights were on the left and right instead of the middle. The taillight array also changed for 1972 onwards, with the Challenger now having four individual rectangular lamps.

Collectibility
Although few mourned the end of the E-body models, the passage of time has created legends and highlighted the unique personalities of both the Challenger and the Barracuda. With a low total production, as well as low survivability over the years, any Challenger is worth a substantial amount of money. In a historic review, the editors of Edmunds Inside Line ranked these models as: 1970 was a "great" year, 1971 was a "good" one, and then "three progressively lousier ones" (1972–1974).

Export markets
Dodge Challengers were mainly produced for the U.S. and Canadian markets. Chrysler officially sold Challengers to Switzerland through AMAG Automobil- und Motoren AG in Schinznach-Bad, near Zurich. Only a few cars were shipped overseas each year to AMAG. They did the final assembly of the Challengers and converted them to Swiss specifications. There are few AMAG cars still in existence. From a collector's point of view, these cars are very desirable. Today, fewer than five Swiss Challengers are known to exist in North America.

Chrysler exported Dodge Challengers officially to France as well through their Chrysler France Simca operation, since Ford sold the Mustang in France successfully in small numbers. However, only a few Challengers were exported and Chrysler finally gave up the idea of selling them in France.

Engines
The SAE gross horsepower ratings were determined testing the engine with no accessories, no air cleaner, or open dyno headers.

Production numbers

Second generation (1978–1983)

Beginning with the 1978 model year, Dodge marketed a rebadged variant of the early Mitsubishi Galant Lambda coupe, as the Dodge Challenger — through Dodge dealers as a captive import, originally as the "Dodge Colt Challenger". Chrysler's Plymouth brand marketed its own rebadged variant as the Plymouth Sapporo, and a rebadged variant was marketed overseas as the Mitsubishi Sapporo/Scorpion and sold. 

Both the Sapporo and Challenger were redesigned in 1981 with revised bodywork and increased foot room, head room, trunk capacity and sound-proofing. Both cars were marketed until 1983, when they were replaced by the Conquest using the same rear-wheel-drive platform through 1989, and in 1984 by the front-wheel-drive Laser and Daytona.

The car retained the frameless hardtop styling of the old Challenger, but had smaller engines, a 1.6 L inline-four and a 2.6 L inline-four instead of the slant-6 and V8 engines of the original Challenger models. Mitsubishi pioneered the use of balance shafts to help damp engine vibrations.

Third generation (2008–present)

In late 2005, Dodge teased spy photos of the Dodge Challenger prototype on the internet and it was announced on November 21, 2005, showing an official drawing sketch of the vehicle. The Dodge Challenger Concept was unveiled at the 2006 North American International Auto Show and was a preview for the 3rd generation Dodge Challenger that started its production in 2008. Many design cues of the Dodge Challenger Concept were adapted from the 1970 Dodge Challenger R/T.

Initial release
On December 3, 2007, Chrysler started taking deposits for the 3rd-generation Dodge Challenger which debuted on February 6, 2008, simultaneously at the Chicago Auto Show and Philadelphia International Auto Show. As with Chevrolet's new Camaro, the Challenger concept car's pillarless hardtop body was replaced with a fixed "B" pillar, hidden behind the side glass to give an illusion of the hardtop. A convertible version was planned, but cancelled over concerns with weight and a low market demand for convertibles. The LC chassis is a modified (shortened wheelbase) version of the LX platform that underpins the Dodge Charger (LX), Dodge Magnum, and the Chrysler 300. The LX was developed in America from the previous Chrysler LH platform, which had been designed to allow it to be easily upgraded to rear and all-wheel drive. Many Mercedes components were incorporated, or used for inspiration, including the Mercedes-Benz W220 S-class control arm front suspension, the Mercedes-Benz W211 E-Class 5-link rear suspension, the W5A580 5-speed automatic, the rear differential, and the ESP system. All (7119) 2008 models were SRT8s and equipped with the  Hemi V8 engine and a 5-speed AutoStick automatic transmission. The entire 2008 Canadian produced run of 6,400 US market cars were pre-sold and production commenced on May 8, 2008.

Chrysler auctioned off two 2008 SRT8s for charity with the first car going for US$400,000 and a "B5" Blue No.43 car with a winning bid of US$228,143.43.

Several different exterior colors, with either cloth or leather interiors became available. Standard features included air conditioning, power windows, locks, and mirrors; cruise control, and  aluminum wheels. Leather upholstery, heated front seats, sunroof, 18-inch aluminum wheels, and a premium audio system are available as options, as are ABS, and stability and traction control. The Canadian market also sports the SXT trim, similar to the SE, but more generous in terms of standard features. Some of these features being ESP, an alarm system, and  wheels. Starting with the 2012 model year, the SE was replaced in the U.S. with the SXT model.

Previous to the 2012 model year, the SXT version of the Challenger was only sold in Canada and is a more well-equipped variation of the SE. It adds fog lamps, a rear spoiler, larger wheels, illuminated vanity mirrors, a security alarm, and a leather-wrapped shifter. In addition, the SXT has increased option packages available to it that aren't available on the SE, and are also available to the R/T. (Such as the high-end navigation-enabled entertainment system.)

Challenger 500
Chrysler Canada offered a further 670 SRTs uniquely badged as the Challenger 500 (paying homage to Charger and Coronet 500s) all of which were shipped to Canadian Dodge dealers.

2009 model year

Production of the limited edition 2008 SRT8s ended in July 2008, and production of the expanded 2009 line-up started in early August of the same year. The expanded offering was the same as had been unveiled earlier that spring at the 2008 New York Auto Show. Chrysler debuted the full Dodge Challenger line-up for 2009, with four different trims – SE, R/T, SRT8, and the SXT in Canada only. In addition to the SRT8, which remained unchanged except for the optional 6-speed manual and standard limited-slip differential, the line-up included the previously mentioned SE and SXT which offered the  3.5 L V6.

New for 2009 was the Rallye Package for the SE model. The package featured design cues including dual body stripes on the hood and the trunk, chromed fuel cap, decklid spoiler, 18-inch aluminum wheels, and Micro Carbon interior accents.

The mid-level Challenger R/T is powered by a  Hemi V8 coupled to a 5-speed automatic transmission or a Tremec TR-6060 6-speed manual transmission. Another feature was the Intelligent Deceleration Fuel Shut-Off (iDFSO) available for the automatic models only. The first to combine both a Multi-Displacement system and fuel shut-off. The final drive ratio was 3.06:1 on cars with the automatic transmission, 3.73:1 on cars with the 6-speed manual and  wheels or 3.92:1 with the 6-speed manual and optional  wheels. Also available on R/T was the "Track Pak" option group, which includes the Tremec manual transmission, a limited slip differential, and self-leveling rear shock absorbers.

The Challenger R/T Classic has retro aspects such as script "Challenger" badges on the front panels and black or white "R/T" stripes. It comes with a five-speed automatic standard, with an optional six-speed manual transmission including a pistol-grip-shifter. The wheels are Heritage 20-inch Torq-Thrust style specials. It became available in Brilliant Black Crystal Pearl, Bright Silver Metallic, Stone White, and in multiple "heritage" colors: Toxic Orange, HEMI-Orange, TorRed, B5 Blue, Plum Crazy Purple, Detonator Yellow, and Furious Fuchsia. Production started in February 2009.

The 2009 SRT8, while still equipped with the 6.1 L (370 cu in) Hemi V8, was virtually identical to its 2008 counterpart, with the main difference being the choice of either a 5-speed automatic or 6-speed manual transmission. Standard features include Brembo brakes, a sport suspension, bi-xenon headlamps, heated leather sport seats, keyless go, Sirius satellite radio, and  forged aluminum wheels in addition to most amenities offered on the R/T and SE models such as air conditioning and cruise control. In addition, the 2009 had a "limited slip" differential that was not offered on the 2008 model. A "Spring Special" SRT8 Challenger was also offered in B5 Blue, but due to rolling plant shutdowns, approximately 250 Spring Special Challengers were built before the end of the 2009 model year.

The Mopar '10 Challenger R/T is a limited version of the 2010 Challenger R/T with metallic pearl black body color, three accent colors (blue, red, silver) of stripes to choose from. In addition, these cars were available with black R/T Classic-style wheels along with a Hurst aftermarket pistol grip shifter, custom badging, Mopar cold air intake for a ten-horsepower increase, and a Katzkin-sourced aftermarket interior. The cars were built in Brampton Assembly and completed at the Mopar Upfit Center in Windsor, Ontario. There were 500 U.S. units and 100 Canadian units built. Of the 500 Mopar special edition U.S. versions, 320 had automatic transmissions, 180 had manuals, while 255 had blue stripes, 115 had red stripes, and 130 had silver stripes. A limited numbered run of 400 SRTs in 2010 were produced with "Furious Fuchsia" paint and white leather seats with horizontal fuchsia-colored slash bars on the backrests. Special badging on the passenger side dash script denotes the production number of each individual car ranging from the numbers 1 to 400. Dodge marketed this package as an homage to the original Panther Pink cars 40 years previous. These cars came with both automatic and Tremec six-speed transmissions.

The Drag Race Package is a race model designed for NHRA competition, based on the Dodge Challenger SRT-8. The car is  lighter than the street vehicle by eliminating major production components and systems. To accentuate the weight savings, they also feature added composite, polycarbonate, and lightweight components designed for drag racing that is part of the new Package Car program. The engine was repositioned to improve the driveline angle and weight distribution. The  wheelbase was shortened by ½ inch. The car also features a front cradle with bolt-in crossmember and solid engine mounts.

At least 50 Challenger Drag Race Package Cars were built to meet NHRA requirements. Engine options include a 6.1 L Hemi, 5.7  Hemi, and a 5.9 L Magnum Wedge. Manual or automatic transmissions are available, and the rear axle is solid (not IRS). An initial run of the required 50 cars was completed and over 100 of the "2009 Challenger Drag Pak" vehicles were produced. "Big Daddy" Don Garlits bought the first drag race package car and raced it in NHRA competition. The prototype cars shown at SEMA were built by MPR Racing of Michigan, who continue to modify the production cars as delivered from Chrysler.

2010 model year
In its second year of production, the Challenger received only a few minor feature and option changes. Electronic stability control is newly standard across the entire Challenger model line. R/T models gained the following standard features: automatic headlamps, an LED-lit cupholder, and door-handle lights. UConnect Multimedia and UConnect Navigation options now include steering-wheel audio controls while UConnect Multimedia features have been combined with the optional Sound Group.

The most significant new option for 2010 is the Super Track Pack, which brings a host of track-ready hardware and upgrades that includes:
 20x9 wheels with Goodyear F1 Super Car tires
 Front and rear Sachs Nivomat self-leveling shock-absorbers
 Larger rear stabilizer bar (20mm > 16mm stock)
 Variable displacement performance steering pump (standard on 6 speed)
 3.06 rear-axle ratio (n/a on 6-speed R/Ts which maintain 3.92 ratio)
 Anti-lock 4-Wheel disc heavy-duty brakes with performance brake linings
 "ESP-off" stability calibration. A limited-slip differential remained standard only on R/Ts equipped with the 6-speed manual transmission.

2011 model year

The Ram emblem disappeared with the 2011 model year (as the namesake truck was being spun off as its own brand), and Challengers received two new engines, the Pentastar, and a 392 Hemi.
 In 2011, the Challenger Rallye Package added dual red out-lined center stripes, premium leather interior with heated front seats, body-color rear spoiler, performance-tuned steering with sport suspension and handling package, further upgraded brakes, and unique Foose designed 18-inch Rallye wheels.
 The R/T received revisions including a new bottom grille cutout and an updated suspension.
 The new SRT8's chin spoiler was enlarged to create more downforce. It resembles the 1970 Challenger R/T. The SRT8 received a new 6.4-liter Hemi V8. Dodge engineers stated they sacrificed peak horsepower ratings for low-end torque, stating a  increase over the outgoing 6.1-L (370 c.i.d.) Hemi V8 at 2,900 rpm. Two transmissions were offered: a 5-Speed Shiftable Automatic and a 6-speed manual. With the revised 6.4-liter engine, Chrysler engineers cited a quarter mile (~400 m) time of 12.4 seconds at  – bettering the outgoing 6.1 L Hemi by 0.8 seconds, although that figure has varied wildly between automotive magazines.

2012 model year
The base SE trim was renamed to SXT for consistency with the naming scheme of the remaining Dodge lineup. The SRT8 392 model gains a two-mode adaptive suspension system that features an Auto and Sport mode. The car uses a variety of sensors to measure inputs like vehicle speed, steering angle, brake torque, throttle position, and acceleration forces to instantly tune the suspension for the given condition depending on what mode is chosen. In addition, a new heated steering wheel featuring Chrysler's new paddle shifter system, new sport seats, and a 900 watt Harman Kardon audio system became available.

2013 model year

For 2013, a Rallye Redline package is available with Dodge Challenger V6 models. Based on the SXT Plus trim, the Rallye Redline package includes unique exterior accents, Black chrome 20-inch wheels with Redline Red accents, performance suspension and brakes, a 3.06 rear-axle ratio, and available Radar Red Nappa leather interior.

The Electronic Vehicle Tracking System (EVTS), a GPS-enabled stolen vehicle recovery system became available.

2014 model year
The Challenger largely soldiered on with minimal changes for 2014. A new performance package called the "Super Sport Group" was made available for V6 Challengers and included the performance-suspension, steering, and brakes from the R/T Challengers, a 3.07:1 axle ratio with 215mm rear axle for faster acceleration, rear spoiler, and 20-inch chrome wheels with wider P245/45R20 all-season performance tires. The "Sinister Super Sport pack" was a Super Sport Group but with black wheels instead of chrome. The Challenger SRT8 also gained a launch control system.

Dodge Challenger 100th Anniversary Edition
The 100th Anniversary Edition is a version of 2014 Dodge Challenger SXT Plus with a Pentastar V6 engine or R/T Plus with a Hemi V8 engine, commemorating the 100th anniversary of brothers Horace Elgin Dodge and John Francis Dodge introducing the Dodge Model 30, with choice of 8 body colors (Pitch Black, Bright White, Billet Silver, Granite Crystal, Ivory Tri-Coat, Phantom Black Tri-Coat, Header Orange and an exclusive High Octane Red pearl), 20x8-inch polished five-spoke aluminum wheels with Granite Crystal pockets, "Dodge Est. 1914" bar-style front-fender badges, Dodge "100" logo on the center caps, a body-color rear spoiler, a red "R/T" heritage grille badge on R/T Plus model, sport seats with all-new Molten Red or Foundry Black Nappa leather upholstery, a custom cloud overprint at sport seats, center console armrest and door armrests; a unique three-spoke flat-bottom performance steering wheel with die-cast paddle shifters, brass-colored accent stitching on leather-wrapped surfaces, Dark Brushed Graphite center console bezels, Liquid Graphite steering-wheel accents, die-cast "Dodge Est. 1914" circular badges on front seatbacks, an embroidered anniversary logo on floor mats, all-new instrument panel cluster graphics (unique black-face gauges with white indication, stand-out red "100" mph indication), Electronic Vehicle Information Center and Uconnect touchscreen Radio with unique startup image, sport mode calibration, a performance-tuned suspension, 2 unique key fobs with 100th Anniversary Edition jeweled logo on the backside, a customized owner's kit, a special commemorative book celebrating the 100 years of Dodge heritage.

The 100th Anniversary Edition was unveiled in the 2013 LA Auto Show. The car was set to appear in Dodge showrooms during the first quarter of 2014. The Canadian model was set to appear in Dodge showrooms during the first quarter of 2014.

2015 model year (facelift)

For the 2015 model year, changes include:
The high-performance "SRT-8" trim was retired, replaced by SRT 392 and SRT Hellcat.
5-speed automatic transmission replaced by a new 8-speed ZF 8HP automatic transmission
A slightly revamped exterior features a new grille with design cues from the 1971 Challenger, Quad LED 'Halo Ring" headlights, LED taillights, and functional hood intakes on all models. 
Inside, the Challenger gets a  TFT (thin film transistor) display with over one hundred possible configurations, 8.4-inch Uconnect touchscreen radio with available navigation, and a retro-styled gauge cluster.
Six-Piston front Brembo brakes with Two-Piece 15.4-inch vented/slotted Rotors and 4-piston rear Brembo brakes on SRT 392 and SRT Hellcat models.

SRT Hellcat 

This engine is also available in the Dodge Charger SRT Hellcat full-sized sedan, the Jeep Grand Cherokee Trackhawk SUV, and as the Hellcrate engine swap kit. The inner driving light on the left front has been removed to allow air to get into the engine resulting in more torque, and the wheel wells are different from the standard SRT to accommodate the 20-inch aluminum wheels. 

The Hellcat has a quarter-mile time of 11.2 seconds; this was accomplished with street legal drag tires.

The Challenger Hellcat has a lateral acceleration of 0.94 g.

The Challenger Hellcat was able to complete its Gingerman Raceway lap in 1:45.8, the Hockenheim Short in 1:14.6  and the Motown Mile in 0:56.37.

2016 model year

For the 2016 model year, the Challenger received new Go Mango orange and Plum Crazy purple paint colors as well as the Blacktop appearance package. 

Most were white with black Carbon-fiber 'rally stripes', but a small number were red, with black carbon-fiber stripes. The upgraded models were 'sticker priced' at about $80,000. The program was terminated by Dodge, who announced the 2017 Challenger Hellcat with upgraded performance, and began work on The Demon model (which was not available for sale until the 2018 model year).

2017 model year
 
For the 2017 model year, a GT model was introduced with an all-wheel drive (AWD) version of the SXT Plus, making the Challenger the only two-door muscle car with available AWD. The Challenger GT uses the same AWD system and suspension as the Dodge Charger Pursuit. It is available exclusively with the 3.6-liter V6 Pentastar engine and the 8-speed automatic transmission.

The AWD system includes both an active transfer case and front-axle disconnect system. The system defaults to rear-wheel drive (RWD) but can seamlessly transition between RWD and AWD if certain conditions are met, like low external temperature, rainfall, or loss of traction. No driver input is required. In Sport Mode, the car uses AWD exclusively. The AWD system in the Challenger GT is configured to be rear-biased (applies more power to the rear wheels). Only up to 38% of power is transferred to the front wheels.

Other model additions include the 5.7-liter V8 equipped T/A and 6.4-liter V8 equipped T/A 392 models. T/A models include a black painted hood with center air intake, black roof, black decklid, bodyside graphics, a cold-air induction system through the front headlamps similar to that used in the Challenger SRT Hellcat, Houndstooth cloth performance seats, and white-faced gauges. T/A 392 models include everything on T/A models in addition to the more powerful 6.4 L V8, six-piston front Brembo brakes with two-piece 15.4-inch vented/slotted rotors and 4-piston rear Brembo brakes, and 20x9.5-inch wheels with 275/40ZR20 tires. Every Challenger gains an updated Uconnect infotainment system; the optional 8.4-inch touchscreen with navigation adds multitouch gestures.

Models equipped with the 5.7-liter V8 now have an electronically controlled low-restriction active exhaust for a more aggressive exhaust note. Among the other additions are standard Houndstooth cloth seats on some models and revised paint choices. Green Go, Yellow Jacket, Destroyer Grey, and Octane Red are new colors, while White Knuckle and Contusion Blue are renamed carryovers.

2018 model year 
Minor changes were made for the 2018 model year. For SXT and R/T models equipped with the 3.6-liter V6 and 5.7-liter V8, a new Performance Handling Group package is available. This package adds 4-piston black Brembo brakes (a $500 option for red brake calipers is optional) in the front along with a Bilstein performance suspension, 20x9 inch wheels with 245/45ZR20 performance tires, and upgraded steering. The Challenger GT gains a new 19-inch wheel option while SXT Plus and R/T Plus trims equipped with the Super Track package come with Nappa leather and microsuede sport seats. The SXT, R/T, R/T Shaker, and T/A models receive a standard 7.0-inch Uconnect touchscreen. A backup camera is now standard. For exterior colors, new additions include F8 Green, IndiGO Blue, B5 Blue and Plum Crazy.

SRT Demon

The Demon is a limited production wide-body and extreme (drag race level) performance variant of the already high-performance Challenger SRT Hellcat. It debuted during the New York Auto Show in April 2017.

The car weighs  less than the Hellcat, the total being . The SRT Demon uses a set of road tires by Nitto Tire, called the NT05R. The tires are the 315/40R18 variations at both front and rear. The tires are targeted for the drag strip, but have enough tread pattern to make them legal for the road. This tire, although an NT05R consumer tire, is a variation built specifically to withstand the power output of the Demon. This makes the Challenger SRT Demon the first production car to contain a set of drag radial road tires. The SRT Demon contains a system that is used specifically for drag racing called transbrake. Dodge uses a unique transbrake that puts the transmission in 1st gear and 2nd gear  simultaneously, holding the Demon stationary. This is used along with the car's torque converter to build up hydraulic pressure before launch.

This makes the Demon the fastest non-electric production car to reach 0-60 mph (0–97 km/h) and to complete a straight-line quarter mile at its time of announcement. The SRT Demon is also capable of accelerating at 1.8 G's of force at launch, making this the hardest launching production car. With this extreme power, and hard acceleration, the SRT Demon is the first production car to perform a wheelie.

Because of the lack of an NHRA certified roll cage, which is required if the quarter-mile time is under 10 seconds, the NHRA banned the SRT Demon from competition.

With the red key and the use of 100+ octane gasoline, the Demon can utilize its full power potential. Only 3,300 cars were made, with production beginning in the summer of 2017 and market introduction happening in the fall of 2017.

The interior of the SRT Demon is the same as all other Challenger trims, but with changes that differentiate it to the other trims. The Demon only includes a front driver's seat as standard, and no other seats front or rear in the vehicle. However, the front passenger's seat, as well as a rear bench seat, can both be added back as options for one dollar each. To replace the rear seats, Dodge included rear roll bars, and has a 4-point harness installed on it for the driver seat. The dashboard display and the seats now have the Demon logo on them, and includes a performance display on it, as well as on the center console touch screen.

 Weight reduction was achieved by removing the front passenger seat (it could be added back), rear seat, speakers, trunk trim, parking sensors, and insulators, among other items.  The SRT Demon also uses lightweight aluminum alloy wheels, pistons, calipers, and brake rotors.

The SRT Demon was chosen as one of the Top 10 Tech Cars by the IEEE in 2018.

Specifications
Specifications of the Challenger SRT Demon are as follows:

 8-speed ZF 8HP automatic transmission as standard, with steering wheel mounted shift paddles
 Runs on 91 octane premium fuel or 100 octane racing fuel
 1.8 g (17.7 m·s−2) of longitudinal g-force at launch
 Air conditioning 
 Uconnect  touchscreen audio system (with SRT performance pages) 
 Front and rear fender flares (adds  to overall width of car)
 Alcantara-wrapped steering wheel (with shift paddles mounted on it)
 Stitched or embossed Demon emblems on front seatbacks
  speedometer (with Demon-themed TFT reconfigurable instrument cluster)
 Factory-installed transbrake System
  street-legal, Drag Radial Tires
 Factory-installed SRT "Power-Chiller" (a system that uses the vehicle's air conditioning to pre-cool the intercooler before the run and thus further compress air from the supercharger)
 Front passenger and rear bench seat delete with rear roll bar (items can be re-added for a dollar each) 
 Functional hood scoop (largest hood scoop in any production car)
 2-Speaker Audio System (Harman Kardon audio system is optional)

The "Demon Crate" 
Each Demon purchaser received a Demon Crate with their order, which contains the following items:
 Direct-connection powertrain control module (PCM)
 Low-restriction air filter
 High-octane racing fuel switch bank
 Personalized and serialized carbon fiber instrument panel badge
 Passenger-side exterior door mirror delete plate
 Lightweight hydraulic floor jack (w/ Demon logo)
 Torque wrench with associated sockets (w/ Demon logo)
 Tire pressure gauge (w/ Demon Logo)
 Impact wrench; cordless and rechargeable (w/ Demon logo and charger)
 Fender cover (w/ Demon logo)
 Tool bag (w/ Demon logo)
 "Demon Track Pack System"
 Personalized and serialized badge (w/ Demon logo)

Discontinuation 
The last SRT Demon rolled off the assembly line in Brampton, Ontario, Canada on May 31, 2018. It was sold at a Barrett-Jackson auction in June 2018 alongside the final Dodge Viper.

2019 model year 
For the 2019 model year, Dodge released new high-performance versions of the Challenger, trimmed the line-up down to six models, and made numerous other tweaks and changes. The model line-up for 2019 includes the following trims: SXT, GT, R/T, R/T Scat Pack, SRT Hellcat, and SRT Hellcat Redeye. Both SXT and GT models are now available in both rear and all-wheel drive, with the GT previously having been the only model available in AWD. GTs gain a more aggressive look with a performance hood, front splitter, steering and suspension while maintaining the optional performance handling group which includes wider wheels, performance summer tires, 4-piston Brembo brakes, and fixed-rate Bilstein suspension. The SXT model loses the performance handling group as an option, lacks the more aggressive exterior upgrades of the GT and has less aggressive gearing, making it the cheaper economical alternative. R/T Scat Pack models come with a new power-bulge aluminum hood standard. Shared with the SRT Hellcat, this hood features dual air extractors that cool the engine and help reduce lift. For 5.7L and 6.4L V8 R/T models, the rear seats can be deleted at the cost of $1 and have a net weight savings of 55 lbs. In addition, a second level of the performance handling group called the "performance plus package" is offered, providing 20-inch x 9.5-inch low-gloss black forged wheels, 275/40ZR20 Pirelli P Zero summer tires, and a limited-slip differential in addition to the upgrades found in the performance handling group which remains unchanged since its introduction in 2018.

A new dual-snorkel hood is introduced. Additionally, the 2019 model's starting price is more than $5,500 lower compared to the 2018 model. A 6-speed Tremec manual and ZF 8-speed automatic remain the sole transmission options.

SRT Hellcat Redeye: Following the discontinuation of the Demon, the Redeye was developed to fill the void. Other upgrades include reinforced ZF 8 speed automatic transmission, track-tuned suspension, torque Reserve and 41-spline heavy-duty half-shafts, SRT power chiller, and after-run chiller.

Specially developed Nexen 275/40R20l street-legal drag radial tires are available for better grip.

The Dodge Challenger R/T Scat Pack 1320 can be modified for NHRA competition in accordance with Stock and Super Stock class rules. It will feature a class weight break of 8.72 and carry a minimum weight of 3,400 pounds. Contestants intending to compete at an NHRA event must meet all regulations for the category entered.

Widebody Package: For the 2019 model year, buyers can order the Challenger Scat Pack, SRT Hellcat, and SRT Hellcat Redeye with the "Widebody Package". When purchased, the Challenger gains the following:
 Widebody fender flares
 20x11 Devils Rim forged aluminum wheels
 305/35ZR20 Pirelli 3-season performance (P Zero Nero all-season) tires
 3-mode Bilstein adaptive damping suspension uniquely tuned for competition use
 6-piston calipers with 15.4 inch vented and slotted rotors in the front (standard on Hellcat and Hellcat Redeye models)
 Stiffened anti-roll bars sized 34mm in front and 22mm rear (standard on Hellcat and Hellcat Redeye models)

2020 model year 

For the 2020 model year, Dodge introduced a SRT Super Stock model slotting in between the Hellcat Redeye and the Demon. This is enabled by a revision of the powertrain calibration, which increases the redline from 6300 to 6400 rpm. Additionally, the Super Stock gains lightweight 18-inch wheels with the same drag radials as the Demon, along with a shorter final-drive ratio and drag-optimized suspension tuning for the Bilstein adaptive dampers in Track Mode. However, it uses four-piston Brembo and 14.2-inch rotors instead of the Redeye's six-piston Brembo and 15.4-inch rotors. A 50th Anniversary Package was also announced for GT RWD, R/T Shaker, R/T Scat Pack, and R/T Scat Pack Shaker Widebody models, as well as the SRT Hellcat and SRT Hellcat Redeye. The package includes a body paint matched Shaker hood scoop, 20-inch wheels in Gold School colour and matching 6-piston Brembo brake calipers on wide body models, and a special grille badge, with Nappa leather and Alcantara upholstery featuring gold sepia stitching, a serialized number 1/70 (one of seventy made) plaque, and carbon-fiber trim inside. Each model was limited to 70 units; colors include Frostbite, Hellraisin, Sinamon Stick, TorRed, F8 Green, Go Mango, and an exclusive Gold Rush.

2021 model year
For the 2021 model year, Dodge added Gold Rush on the T/A, T/A 392, SRT Hellcat, and SRT Hellcat Redeye models. R/T Scat Pack Shaker and T/A 392 models gain a wide-body option, while 20-inch wheels and tires are now standard on the GT AWD model. The Hellcat model is only available in the ZF 8-speed automatic, as the 6-speed Tremec manual has been removed as an option for the Hellcat pending revised calibrations by Dodge. The Manual transmission will continue to be available for the R/T, and R/T Scat Pack.

2023 model year
For the 2023 model year, Dodge returned the 6-speed Tremec manual transmission to the Hellcat for the last time, making it the standard gearbox.

Limited production 3rd party variants
In addition to official Dodge concept cars, there have been numerous limited production and street legal variants created by third parties, based on stock cars that have been rebuilt with modified powertrains, suspensions, and interiors.

Dodge Challenger Convertible
Starting August 16, 2022, the Challenger Convertible can be ordered at official Dodge dealers. Customers will then work with Drop Top Customs, the conversion firm, and the Dodge dealer to create their vehicle. The convertible option is open for 2022 Challenger R/T, R/T Scat Pack and all Challenger SRT models.

Safety

Sales

Racing

The Challenger was introduced to the SCCA Trans Am Series in 1970. Two factory-backed cars were prepared by Ray Caldwell's Autodynamics and driven by Sam Posey and Tony Adamowicz. The No.77 car was built at Autodynamics from a street Challenger T/A that was taken from a local dealer showroom. The No.76 chassis arrived mid-season from Dan Gurney's All-American Racers and was completed by Autodynamics.
 Dodge's early to mid-1970s factory-supported "Kit Car" program for short-track late-model stock car racing offered a choice of Challenger, and a few (less than 12) were made, but in 1974 Dodge ended the Challenger line and they went to the Dodge Dart Sports and Dodge Aspen bodies over a steel-tube chassis.
 Blackforest Motorsports has currently entered a Challenger in the Continental Challenge.
 The Challenger R/T has been used as the Chrysler model for starting in 2010 NASCAR Nationwide Series competition.

With Dodge officially out of NASCAR at the end of the 2012 season, the remaining cars and racing parts have been bought up by "privateer" racing teams and continue to show up in Nationwide Series during the 2013 and 2014 seasons. J. J. Yeley indicated his two-car team would continue to field a Challenger in the series for as long as he can find parts to keep the cars running. The team stopped after the 2014 season after his No. 93 (later No. 28) regularly ran in the top-20 during races, though the Mike Harmon-owned No. 74 and the Derek White-operated No. 40 qualified and ran Dodges in 2015. Mike Harmon Racing ran a Dodge the entire season and also did so in 2016, and has raced in over half of the 2017 season so far. Likewise, White's MBM Motorsports team fielded the Nos. 13 and 40 as Dodges in some races. MBM continues to field Dodges into 2018 with Timmy Hill in the 66 (was the 13).

In late 2014 two Challengers fielded by Miller Racing with the support of SRT and Mopar driven by Cameron Lawrence and Joe Stevens started racing in the Trans-Am Series's TA2 class. Both cars used a spec Howe road racing tube chassis with fiberglass bodies. Powered by a Hemi 392 slightly modified for road racing extremes and restricted by class rules, the cars made around 500 horsepower. Except for slightly bulged fenders and large rear wing, the cars look very much like the stock/street version, despite being roughly 7/8s the size of the road car. Lawrence won four of 12 races in the 2015 season, finishing third overall in the Trans Am TA2 championship. 
Joe Stevens in the No. 11 "Green Car" finished sixth overall after a fourth place at the season finale at Daytona International Speedway. Joe Stevens also received the Cool Shirt Hard Charger award for his excellent rookie season performance. For the 2016 season, the Stevens-Miller Team fielded three Challengers in the TA2 series and ran in 16 events, scoring a few wins. The No. 77 car was painted in a throw-back paint scheme very similar to the 1970 No. 77 car driven by Sam Posey. The No. 12 car occasionally fielded a blue scheme paying tribute to the Plymouth Cuda Trans-Am car driven by Swede Savage.

In March 2017 the Challenger returned to the TA class in Trans-Am at Sebring after a nearly 40-year absence from Trans-Am's fastest class of racing. It was driven by Jeff Hinkle under the American V8 Road Racing team with John Debenedictis as crew chief. The car was orange and purple with stripes of many of the other challenger colors to celebrate the current stable of cars for the street. It is powered by a Penske Engines Mopar R5 / P7 carbureted engine producing . In its debut, it qualified 16th and finished 9th out of a field of 24.

At all Superbike World Championship races held in the United States, Fiat's Alfa Romeo safety car is replaced with Chrysler's Dodge Challenger.

Notes

References

External links

 Dodge Challenger: History of the Dodge Pony Car
 Here is Complete Information about Dodge Challenger

1970s cars
1980s cars
2000s cars
2010s cars
2020s cars
Convertibles
Coupés
Pony cars
Challenger
Muscle cars
Rear-wheel-drive vehicles
Retro-style automobiles
Cars introduced in 1969